Salvatore Joseph Mosca (April 27, 1927 – July 28, 2007) was an American jazz pianist who was a student of Lennie Tristano.

Mosca was born in Mount Vernon, New York, United States, to Italian American parents. He worked in cool jazz and post-bop. After playing in the United States Army Band during World War II, he studied at the New York College of Music using funds provided by the G.I. Bill. He began working with Lee Konitz in 1949, and also worked with Warne Marsh. He spent much of his career teaching and was relatively inactive after 1992, but new CDs were released in 2004, 2005, and 2008.

He died from emphysema in White Plains, New York, at the age of 80.

Discography

As leader/co-leader

As sideman
With Lee Konitz
Subconscious-Lee (Prestige, 1950)
The New Sounds (Prestige, 1951) with Miles Davis
Lee Konitz with Warne Marsh (Atlantic LP 1217, 1956)Inside Hi-Fi (Atlantic, 1956)Very Cool (Verve, 1957)Spirits'' (Milestone, 1971)

References

External links
[ All Music]
Official website
Discography

1927 births
2007 deaths
American jazz pianists
American male pianists
American people of Italian descent
American jazz musicians
Cool jazz pianists
New York College of Music alumni
Musicians from Mount Vernon, New York
20th-century American pianists
Jazz musicians from New York (state)
20th-century American male musicians
American male jazz musicians
Sunnyside Records artists
Deaths from emphysema